Santonio Thomas (born July 2, 1981 in Belle Glade, Florida) is an American football defensive end. As an undrafted free agent, he was signed by the New England Patriots in 2005. He played college football at the University of Miami. He's currently a free agent.

Early years
Thomas attended Glades Central High School in Belle Glade, Florida and was a student and a letterman in football. In football, as a senior he led his team to the Class 3A State Championship and was part of a team ranked #20 in the nation by USA Today. He was named as a first-team All-USA selection by USA Today. In the Class 3A State Championship Game, Thomas made 12 tackles and recovered a fumble and took it in for a touchdown.

Professional career

New England Patriots
He joined the Patriots as an undrafted free agent after the 2005 NFL Draft. He spent the 2005 and 2006 seasons on the Patriots' practice squad.

Cleveland Browns
Thomas was signed by the Cleveland Browns on September 16, 2008 after defensive end Robaire Smith was placed on injured reserve. He was waived on September 5, 2009.

External links
Cleveland Browns bio
Miami Hurricanes bio
New England Patriots bio

1981 births
Living people
People from Belle Glade, Florida
Players of American football from Florida
Sportspeople from the Miami metropolitan area
American football defensive tackles
American football defensive ends
Miami Hurricanes football players
New England Patriots players
Cleveland Browns players